USS Earl V. Johnson (DE-702) was a  in service with the United States Navy from 1944 to 1946. She was scrapped in 1968.

Namesake
Earl Vincent Johnson was born on 28 December 1913 in Winthrop, Minnesota, the eldest child of Dr Otto F. and Salma E. Johnson. He enlisted in the United States Naval Reserve on 31 August 1937, and began naval aviation training the next year. He reported to Scouting Squadron 5 (VS-5) on board  on 18 September 1939, and received a regular commission the following year.

He was detached from the squadron in March 1942 and assigned to the ship's company. During the Battle of the Coral Sea, he flew a Douglas SBD Dauntless dive bomber with Yorktown'''s Scouting 5 squadron, attacking Imperial Japanese Navy shipping in Tulagi Harbor and aircraft carriers in the Coral Sea. Lieutenant Johnson was lost in aerial combat on 8 May, and posthumously awarded the Navy Cross.

Construction and commissioningEarl V. Johnson was launched on 24 November 1943 at the Defoe Shipbuilding Company, in Bay City, Michigan, sponsored by Mrs. Selma E. Johnson, mother of Lt.(j.g.) Johnson, and commissioned on 18 March 1944, with Lieutenant Commander J. J. Jordy, USNR, in command.

History
Between 23 May and 19 November 1944, Earl V. Johnson made three voyages as convoy escort, guarding vital troops and supplies travelling from Norfolk to Casablanca and Bizerte.  After training at Boston, Massachusetts, she joined the Pacific Fleet, calling at New York, Norfolk, the Panama Canal, Bora Bora in the Society Islands, and arriving at the giant fleet base at Manus, Admiralty Islands, on 22 January 1945.Earl V. Johnson was assigned patrol duties in the Philippines, and guarded convoys plying between New Guinea and Leyte Gulf until 17 April 1945.  Supporting the invasion of Okinawa, now in full swing, and air strikes on Japan, she became invaluable in moving men and supplies to the advance bases at Kossol Roads and Ulithi.  She departed Leyte on 25 July with an LST convoy bound for Okinawa.  As she returned, on 4 August, a sonar contact developed into a 3-hour duel with a submarine, which damaged Earl V. Johnson but ended favorably with an underwater explosion and a plume of white smoke. Japanese records show this was the submarine I-53 which survived the attack.

With hostilities ended, Earl V. Johnson arrived at Okinawa on 4 September, and a week later, began the occupation of Jinsen and Taku, piloting vessels, guarding against submarines, and spotting and destroying mines.  She departed Buckner Bay, Okinawa, on 8 November 1945, arriving at Boston on 15 December.

She was placed out of commission in reserve at Jacksonville, Florida, on 18 June 1946.Earl V. Johnson'' was stricken from the Navy Register on 1 May 1967, and sold on 3 September 1968.

References

External links  

   navsource.org: USS Earl V. Johnson
 hazegray.org: USS Earl V. Johnson
Photo collection for USS Earl V. Johnson

Buckley-class destroyer escorts
Ships built in Bay City, Michigan
1943 ships